Marcel Albert "Ching" Dheere (December 19, 1918 – November 5, 2002) was a Canadian professional ice hockey forward who played 11 games in the National Hockey League for the Montreal Canadiens. He was born in Saint Boniface, Manitoba.

External links

1918 births
2002 deaths
Canadian expatriate ice hockey players in the United States
Canadian ice hockey forwards
Houston Huskies players
Houston Skippers players
Ice hockey people from Winnipeg
Montreal Canadiens players
People from Saint Boniface, Winnipeg
Portland Buckaroos players
St. Paul Saints (USHL) players
Tulsa Oilers (USHL) players